Cassius Clay (soon Muhammad Ali) fought a ten-round boxing match with Willi Besmanoff in Louisville on November 29, 1961. Clay won the bout through a technical knockout in the seventh round after the referee stopped the fight with Besmanoff sprawled on his back on the canvas.

References

Besmanoff
1961 in boxing
Sports competitions in Louisville, Kentucky
1961 in sports in Kentucky
November 1961 sports events in the United States